Bryn Beryl Hospital is a health facility in Pwllheli, Gwynedd, Wales. It is managed by the Betsi Cadwaladr University Health Board.

History
The hospital was established as the Pwllheli Cottage Hospital in 1924. It was extended by the erection of two wards to create a naval hospital to support the naval training facility HMS Glendower during the Second World War. After it joined the National Health Service in 1948, a prefabricated ward block for geriatric patients was added in 1974. The new Llynfor Ward was opened in newly-refurbished facilities in July 2019.

References

Hospitals in Gwynedd
Hospitals established in 1924
1924 establishments in Wales
Hospital buildings completed in 1924
NHS hospitals in Wales
Betsi Cadwaladr University Health Board